Sir Wilfrid Edward Francis Jackson, GCMG (1883–1971) was a British colonial governor.

Jackson was born in St John's, Newfoundland, the son of Sir Henry Moore Jackson and his wife, Emily, Lady Jackson ( Shea).  Edward St. John Jackson was his younger brother. The brothers were raised in their mother's Roman Catholic faith. He was educated at the Jesuit Stonyhurst College and at Lincoln College, Oxford.

He was the 23rd Governor of Mauritius from 30 August 1930 to 7 June 1937 and was knighted on 3 June 1931. 

During this period the constitution was modified in 1933, and Dr Maurice Curé founded the worker's party as first political party in February 1936. Colonial secretary Edward Walter Evans (1890–1985) acted in place of him for these periods, when he was absent because of professional reasons.

Afterward, Jackson served as Governor of British Guiana from 19 November 1937 to 7 November 1941., and then he was Governor of Tanganyika from 19 June 1941 to 28 April 1945.

References

Colonial Administrative Service officers
Governors of British Guiana
Governors of British Mauritius
Governors of Tanganyika (territory)
Knights Grand Cross of the Order of St Michael and St George
1883 births
1971 deaths
British Guiana in World War II
Colonial Secretaries of Barbados
People educated at Stonyhurst College
Alumni of Lincoln College, Oxford